The Chunsa Film Art Awards (also known as the Icheon Chunsa Film Festival) have been presented in South Korea since the founding of the prize by the Korea Film Directors' Society in 1990. The awards take their name from the pen name of the early Korean actor and filmmaker from the silent film era, Na Woon-gyu. Prizes are given for Best Film, Best Director, Best Actor, Best Actress, Best Supporting Actor, Best Supporting Actress, Best New Director, Best New Actor, Best New Actress, Best Screenplay, Best Cinematography, Best Music/Score, Best Lighting, Best Editing, Best Art Direction, and Technical Award.

*Note: the list below is referenced.

Best Film

Best Director

Best Actor

Best Actress

Best Supporting Actor

Best Supporting Actress

Best New Director

Best New Actor

Best New Actress

Best Young Actor/Actress

Best Screenplay

Best Cinematography

Best Lighting

Best Editing

Best Art Direction

Best Music

Best Planning/Producer

Technical Award

Special Jury Prize

Various

Beautiful Artist in Film Award

Korean Cultural Award

Chunsa 예술인 Award

Chunsa Daesang (Grand Prize)

References

External links
 

South Korean film awards
Awards established in 1990
Annual events in South Korea
1990 establishments in South Korea